Stiff: The Curious Lives of Human Cadavers is a 2003 nonfiction book by Mary Roach. Published by W. W. Norton & Company, it details the unique scientific contributions of the deceased.

In the book, Roach gives firsthand accounts of cadavers, a history of the use of cadavers, and an exploration of the surrounding ethical/moral issues. She places each chapter's content into a historical context by discussing the history of the method of using a cadaver she is about to witness.

Stiff was a Best Seller, a 2003 Barnes & Noble Discover Great New Writers pick, and one of Entertainment Weekly Best Books of 2003. It also won the Amazon.com Editor's Choice award in 2003, was voted as a Borders Original Voices book, and was the winner of the Elle Reader's Prize. Stiff has been translated into 17 languages, including Hungarian (Hullamerev) and Lithuanian (Negyvėliai). Stiff was also selected for Washington State University's Common Reading Program in 2008–09.

Topics covered
The book covers 12 topics:

 Practicing cosmetic surgery on cadaver heads
 Body snatching and the early years of human dissection
 The nature of decomposition
 Cadavers for use as crash test dummies
 Using cadavers to analyze a crash site
 Army tests on cadavers
 Crucifixion experiments
 Beating heart cadavers, the soul, and being buried alive
 Decapitation and human head transplant
 Cannibalism in the name of medicine
 New alternatives to burial and cremation
 The author's views on her own remains

References

External links 
 Mary Roach's website
 Stiff book page on the publisher's (W.W. Norton & Company) website
 Roach talks about Stiff on NPR
 

2003 non-fiction books
Biology books
Books about death
W. W. Norton & Company books
Women and death